Elliott House is a historic building in Wellington, New Zealand.

The house was built for James Sands Elliott, a medical professional, in 1913. The north side served as the family residence, while the Kent Terrace side served as his consultancy room and surgery. The building was renovated in 1988.

The building is classified as a "Category I" ("places of special or outstanding historical or cultural heritage significance or value") historic place by Heritage New Zealand.

References

Buildings and structures in Wellington City
Heritage New Zealand Category 1 historic places in the Wellington Region
Houses in New Zealand
1910s architecture in New Zealand
Historic homes in New Zealand